John Henry Salter (1862 – 5 August 1942) was an English naturalist and ornithologist. He was a professor of botany at the University College of Wales, Aberystwyth. Additionally, he published a book about the birds of Wales.

Biography 
John H. Salter was born in Westleton, near what is nowadays the RSPB Minsmere nature reserve, Suffolk.

Salter was a lecturer in botany at the University of Wales, Aberystwyth, from 1894 to 1899. He then became professor of botany within the same department, going on to hold the chair until 1903.

Salter never owned a car and walked 20 miles a day. He was a non-smoker, teetotaller and vegetarian. He was a Quaker.

He died from a fall in his garden on 5 August 1942.

Bibliography 
Among Salter's publications are:

References

Sources

External links

 

20th-century British biologists
20th-century British botanists
1862 births
1942 deaths
Academics of Aberystwyth University